Langdale is a surname, possibly taken from place names meaning "long valley", such as Great and Little Langdale. Notable people with the name include:

 Alban Langdale or Langdaile (1532–1580), English Roman Catholic churchman
 Baron Langdale, a title used in the British peerage
 Charles Langdale, formerly Stourton (1787–1868), British politician
 Doug Langdale (born 1969), American screenwriter etc.
 George Langdale (1916–2002), English cricketer and schoolmaster
 Jane A. Langdale (born 1960), British botanist and academic
 Mark Langdale (born 1954), American businessman and ambassador
 Pascal Langdale (born Pascal Langlois), English actor
 Stella Langdale (1880–1976), English and Canadian artist